Netball Victoria is the governing body for netball in Victoria, Australia. It is affiliated to Netball Australia. It is responsible for organising and managing the elite level team, Melbourne Vixens, who compete in the Suncorp Super Netball. It is also responsible for organising and managing the Victorian Netball League as well as numerous other leagues and competitions for junior and youth teams. 
Its headquarters are based at the Melbourne Sports Centre – Parkville.

History
Netball is believed to have been played in Victorian primary schools by 1913 and in Victorian high schools by 1915. In 1922, Lousie Mills and Nonie Hardie wanted to play netball competitively. The pair, who worked for the YMCA, called a meeting for girls interested in playing. From there, the Melbourne Girls' Basketball Association was formed. Games started in May 1923 with six teams competing. By the next year, there were twelve teams. In 1928, the Melbourne Girls' Basketball Association transformed into the Victorian Women's Basketball Association (VWBA). They subsequently organised a team to compete in the first Australian National Netball Championships, which were held in Melbourne in September 1928. Victoria won the inaugural event. In 1970, the VWBA changed its name to the Victorian Netball Association.

Representative teams

Current

Former

Competitions
 Victorian Netball League
 Regional Victorian Netball League
 State Titles
 Association Championships
 Schools' Championship

Netball Victoria Board 
Notable board members

Team of the 20th Century

References

External links
   Netball Victoria on Facebook
   Netball Victoria on Twitter
 Netball Victoria on Instagram

 
Victoria
Netball
1928 establishments in Australia